Gwangdeoksan is a mountain on the boundary between the provinces of Gangwon-do and Gyeonggi-do in South Korea. Its area extends across the city of Pocheon and the counties of Hwacheon and Cheorwon.

See also
 List of mountains in Korea

Notes

References 
 

Mountains of Gangwon Province, South Korea
Hwacheon County
Cheorwon County
Mountains of Gyeonggi Province
Pocheon
Mountains of South Korea
One-thousanders of South Korea